Pine Knot Creek is a stream in the U.S. state of Georgia.

Pine Knot Creek was named after the pine trees which are abundant in Georgia.

References

Rivers of Georgia (U.S. state)
Rivers of Chattahoochee County, Georgia
Rivers of Marion County, Georgia